Hynek Čermák (born 19 February 1973) is a Czech actor.

Selected filmography

Film
 Little Knights Tale (2009)
 Kajínek (2010)
 Men in Hope (2011)
 Innocence (2011)
 Gangster Ka (2015)
 Po strništi bos (2017)
 River Rascals (2017)
 National Street (2019)
 The Last Aristocrat (2019)
 Bet on Friendship (2021)
 Shadowplay (2022)
 Borders of Love (2022)
 Children of Nagano (2023)

Television
 Cirkus Bukowsky (2013) 
 Až po uši (2014) 
 Reportérky (2015)
 Rapl (2016)
 Dabing Street (2018) 
 Zkáza Dejvického divadla (2019)
 Případ Roubal (2021)

References

External links
 

   
1973 births
Living people
Male actors from Prague
Czech male film actors
Czech male stage actors
Czech male television actors
21st-century Czech male actors
Czech Lion Awards winners
Academy of Performing Arts in Prague alumni
Czech photographers